Following is a list of senators of Loir-et-Cher, people who have represented the department of Loir-et-Cher in the Senate of France.

Third Republic

Senators for Loir-et-Cher under the French Third Republic were:

 Juste Frédéric Riffault (1876–1879)
 Jean Bozérian (1876–1893)
 Jean-François-Charles Dufay (1879–1897)
 Édouard Ernest Prillieux (1897–1906)
 Pierre Tassin (1893–1906)
 Henri David (1906-1914) died in office
 Henri David (1906–1914)
 Eusèbe Gauvin (1906–1931)
 Pierre Berger (1920–1932)
 Pierre Pichery (1920–1940)
 Édouard Boudin (1933–1934)
 Camille Chautemps (1934–1941)
 Joseph Paul-Boncour (1931–1940)

Fourth Republic

Senators for Loir-et-Cher under the French Fourth Republic were:

 Jacques Boisrond (1946–1959)
 Robert Le Guyon (1948–1955)
 Joseph Beaujannot (1955–1959)

Fifth Republic 
Senators for Loir-et-Cher under the French Fifth Republic:

References

Sources

 
Lists of members of the Senate (France) by department